In the Hebrew Bible, Jedidah was the mother of Josiah, the King of Judah. (2 Kings 22:1) She was the wife of king Amon of Judah and a daughter of Adaiah of Boscath, a town in the Kingdom of Judah.  

Alternate spellings for this Bible character are "Jedida" or "Jeddida".

References 

Queen mothers
Women in the Hebrew Bible
Jewish royalty